The Inquiries Act 2005 (c 12) is an Act of the Parliament of the United Kingdom. According to the explanatory notes, published by the Department for Constitutional Affairs, the Act "is intended to provide a comprehensive statutory framework for inquiries set up by Ministers to look into matters of public concern". The act repealed the entirety of the Tribunals of Inquiry (Evidence) Act 1921, a much shorter bill that also empowered Ministers to set up so-called statutory inquiries. The act was motivated in part by the spiraling costs of the Bloody Sunday Inquiry and a desire to control the length and cost of future inquiries. The act has been criticised by a number of groups and individuals, generally concerned with the power Ministers have over the remit of the inquiry and the publication of its final report.

Criticisms
The Parliament of the United Kingdom's Joint Committee on Human Rights has voiced concerns about certain aspects of the Act, as have the Law Society of England and Wales.

Amnesty International has asked members of the British judiciary not to serve on any inquiry held under the Act, as they contend that "any inquiry would be controlled by the executive which is empowered to block public scrutiny of state actions."

The family of Pat Finucane, a solicitor killed by loyalist paramilitaries in Belfast in suspicious circumstances, have announced they will not be co-operating with a forthcoming inquiry into the events surrounding his death if it is held under the terms of the Act.

The Canadian Judge Peter Cory, who was commissioned by the British and Irish governments to investigate the possibility of state collusion in six high-profile murders, is also a critic. He recommended public inquiries into four of the killings, but has strongly condemned the legislation that quickly followed. In a letter read at a hearing of the United States House Foreign Affairs Subcommittee on Africa, Global Human Rights and International Operations Subcommittee  while the legislation was pending, Cory stated:

The chairman of the hearing, Representative Chris Smith, declared that "the bill pending before the British Parliament should be named the 'Public Inquiries Cover-up Bill.'"

Indeed, the Act repealed the entirety of the Tribunals of Inquiry (Evidence) Act 1921 which had allowed Parliament to vote on a resolution establishing a tribunal that had "all such powers, rights, and privileges as are vested in the High Court" and placed the power solely under the control of a Minister.

Notable Inquiries 
As of November 2021 there have been 29 inquiries established under the act with a further two announced. Of these, 17 have completed costing a total of £158m.

Active Inquiries 
Some of the highest profile, open inquiries authorised under the act include:

 Grenfell Tower Inquiry
 Manchester Arena Inquiry into the Manchester Arena bombing
 Post Office Horizon IT inquiry into the British Post Office scandal - converted from an existing, non-statutory inquiry in September 2020
 Independent Inquiry into Child Sexual Abuse - converted from an existing, non-statutory inquiry in July 2015
 Infected Blood Inquiry into the Contaminated blood scandal in the United Kingdom
 UK Covid-19 Inquiry into the UK’s response to and impact of the Covid-19 pandemic

Former Inquires 

 Inquiry into failures at Mid Staffordshire NHS Foundation Trust
 The Litvinenko Inquiry into the Poisoning of Alexander Litvinenko
 Leveson Inquiry into the News International phone hacking scandal

Repeals and revokes

The Inquiries Act 2005 repealed or revoked all or part of the following acts of parliament or sections of acts:

See also
 Public inquiry (public inquiries in different countries)

References
Halsbury's Statutes,

External links
The Inquiries Act 2005, as amended from the National Archives.
The Inquiries Act 2005, as originally enacted from the National Archives.
Explanatory notes to the Inquiries Act 2005.
Department for Constitutional Affairs - Legislation - Inquiries Act. Snapshot dated 17 January 2009. From the National Archives.

United Kingdom Acts of Parliament 2005